Ferruccio Pisoni (6 August 1936 – 12 December 2020) was an Italian politician who served as a Deputy from 1968 to 1983.

Pisoni died from COVID-19 in 2020.

References

1936 births
2020 deaths
20th-century Italian politicians
Deaths from the COVID-19 pandemic in Italy